Hans Stelius is a retired Swedish footballer. Stelius made 62 Allsvenskan appearances for Djurgården and scored 30 goals.

References

Swedish footballers
Djurgårdens IF Fotboll players
Association footballers not categorized by position
Year of birth missing